Jacques van der Poel (born 5 January 1963) is a Dutch former professional racing cyclist. He rode in the 1986 Giro d'Italia and the 1987 Tour de France.

References

External links
 

1963 births
Living people
Dutch male cyclists
People from Woensdrecht
Cyclists from North Brabant